Bangladesh–South Africa relations refer to the bilateral relations between Bangladesh and South Africa. Bangladesh has a High Commission in Pretoria. The South African High Commission in Sri Lanka is accredited to Bangladesh. Both countries are members of the Commonwealth of Nations.

History
Bangladesh banned its citizens from going to South Africa before the end of apartheid. Bangladesh established ties with South Africa after the election of Nelson Mandela and the end of apartheid. The Minister of foreign affairs of Bangladesh attended the inauguration of Nelson Mandela as the President of South Africa. On 10 September 1994 the two nations established formal diplomatic ties. Bangladesh High Commission was opened on 27 February 1995 in Pretoria, South Africa. As of 2015, South Africa and Kenya were the only African countries that had Bangladeshi diplomatic missions.

Economic
In 2014, South African exports to Bangladesh were worth 852 million rand. Bangladesh exports to South Africa were worth 745 million rand.

Migration
There are about 300,000 (2020) Bangladeshis in South Africa. The majority of whom are asylum seekers. Many Bangladeshis have set up shops.

References

 
South Africa
Bilateral relations of South Africa